The 1912-13 season in Swedish football, starting August 1912 and ending July 1913:

Honours

Official titles

Competitions

Promotions, relegations and qualifications

Promotions

Relegations

Domestic results

Svenska Serien 1912–13

Uppsvenska Serien 1913

Mellansvenska Serien 1913

Västsvenska Serien 1913

Svenska Mästerskapet 1912 
Final

Corinthian Bowl 1912 
Final

Kamratmästerskapen 1912 
Final

Wicanderska Välgörenhetsskölden 1912 
Final

National team results 

 Sweden: 

 Sweden: 

 Sweden: 

 Sweden: 

 Sweden:

National team players in season 1912/13

Notes

References 
Print

Online

 
Seasons in Swedish football